Yi Yi (born July 25, 1989 in Yongzhou, Hunan) is a Chinese actress and host.

Personal life
Yi Yi started learning Latin Dance in 2001, when she studied in Zhejiang University of Media and Communications.

In 2006, she was invited to join Zhejiang Television.

Filmography

Film

Television

Variety

Awards and nominations

References

1989 births
Living people